William Quaye (born 29 March 1941) is a Ghanaian sprinter. He competed in the men's 4 × 100 metres relay at the 1968 Summer Olympics.

References

1941 births
Living people
Athletes (track and field) at the 1960 Summer Olympics
Athletes (track and field) at the 1968 Summer Olympics
Ghanaian male sprinters
Ghanaian male hurdlers
Olympic athletes of Ghana
Place of birth missing (living people)